Kalyan Mitter (5 May 1936 – 16 August 2013) was an Indian first-class cricketer, coach and curator. He was a right-handed batsman and right-arm offbreak bowler.

From 1953 to 1969 he represented Bengal and Bihar in the Ranji Trophy, the domestic first-class cricket competition of India. His highest score was 126 not out for Bengal in an innings victory over Assam in 1957-58. His best bowling figures were 5 for 39 for Bihar in his last match, a victory over Orissa in 1968-69.

He also coached the Bengal cricket team and under his coaching, the side became runner-up in the Ranji Trophy in 1994. He was also the curator of the Eden Gardens ground in the mid-'90s and during the inaugural edition of the IPL.

References

External links
 Kalyan Mitter at CricketArchive

1936 births
2013 deaths
Indian cricketers
East Zone cricketers
Bihar cricketers
Bengal cricketers
Indian Universities cricketers
Indian cricket coaches
Cricketers from Kolkata